Ken or Kenneth Fletcher may refer to:
Ken Fletcher (1940–2006), Australian tennis player
Ken Fletcher (Australian footballer) (born 1948), Australian rules football player (Essendon)
Ken Fletcher (footballer, born 1931) (1931–2011), English football player (Chester City)